
This is a list of aircraft in alphabetical order beginning with 'S'.

Sn

SNC 
 SNC Dream Chaser
 SNC TRJ-328
 SNC TRJ-628

SNCAC 
(Société Nationale de Constructions Aéronautiques du Centre, France)
 SNCAC NC.130
 SNCAC NC.150
 SNCAC NC 211 
 SNCAC NC.223
 SNCAC NC.232
 SNCAC NC.270
 SNCAC NC.271
 SNCAC NC.410
 SNCAC NC.420 
 SNCAC NC.433
 SNCAC NC.470
 SNCAC NC.471
 SNCAC NC.472
 SNCAC NC.510
 SNCAC NC.530
 SNCAC NC.600
 SNCAC NC.700 Martinet
 SNCAC NC.701 Martinet
 SNCAC NC.702 Martinet
 SNCAC NC.800
 SNCAC NC.810
 SNCAC NC.820
 SNCAC NC.830
 SNCAC NC.832 Chardonneret
 SNCAC NC.840 Chardonneret
 SNCAC NC.841 Chardonneret
 SNCAC NC.850
 SNCAC NC.851
 SNCAC NC.853
 SNCAC NC.854
 SNCAC NC.855
 SNCAC NC.856
 SNCAC NC.858
 SNCAC NC.859
 SNCAC NC.860
 SNCAC NC.900
 SNCAC NC.1070
 SNCAC NC.1071
 SNCAC NC.1080
 SNCAC NC.2001 Abeille (Intermeshing rotors)
 SNCAC NC.3021 Belphégor

SNCAM
(Société Nationale de Constructions Aéronautiques du Midi)
see Dewoitine

SNCAN
(Société Nationale de Constructions Aéronautiques du Nord)
 Nord N 262
 Nord N 500
 Nord 1000 Pingouin
 Nord 1001 Pingouin I
 Nord 1002 Pingouin II
 Nord 1100 Me208 / Noralpha prototypes
 Nord 1101 Noralpha
 Nord 1101 Ramier I
 Nord 1102 Noralpha
 Nord 1101 Ramier II
 Nord 1104 Noralpha
 S.F.E.R.M.A.-Nord 1110 Nord-Astazou
 Nord 1200 Norécrin
 Nord 1201 Norécrin I
 Nord 1202 Norécrin
 Nord 1203 Norécrin
 Nord 1204 Norécrin
 Nord 1221 Norélan
 Nord 1222 Norélan
 Nord 1223 Norélan
 Nord 1226 Norélan
 Nord 1400 Noroit
 Nord 1401 Noroit
 Nord 1402 Noroit
 Nord 1402 Gerfaut
 Nord 1405 Gerfaut II
 Nord 1500 Griffon II
 Nord 1500 Noréclair
 Nord 1601
 Nord 1700 Norélic
 Nord 1710
 Nord 1750 Norelfe
 Nord 2000
 Nord 2100 Norazur
 Nord 2101
 Nord 2102
 Nord 2200
 Nord 2500
 Nord 2501 Noratlas
 Nord 2501 Gabriel
 Nord 2502
 Nord 2503
 Nord 2504
 Nord 2505
 Nord 2506
 Nord 2507
 Nord 2508
 Nord 2509
 Nord 2510
 Nord 2520
 Nord 2800
 Nord 3200
 Nord 3201
 Nord 3202
 Nord 3400 Norbarbe
 Nord NC.850
 Nord NC.851
 Nord NC.852
 Nord NC.853
 Nord NC.854
 Nord NC.855
 Nord NC.856
 Nord NC.858
 Nord NC.859

SNCAO
(Société Nationale de Constructions Aéronautiques de l'Ouest)
 SNCAO CAO-30
 SNCAO CAO-200
 SNCAO CAO-400
 SNCAO CAO-600
 SNCAO CAO-700

SNCASE
(Société Nationale de Constructions Aéronautiques du Sud Est)
 SNCASE SE-100 (LeO 50)
 SNCASE SE-101
 SNCASE SE-102
 SNCASE SE-116 Voltigeur
 SNCASE SE-161 Languedoc
 SNCASE SE-200
 SNCASE SE-210 Caravelle
 SNCASE SE-212 Durandal
 SNCASE SE-316
 SNCASE SE-400
 SNCASE SE-500
 SNCASE SE-520
 SNCASE SE-532 Mistral
 SNCASE SE-535 Mistral
 SNCASE SE-580
 SNCASE SE-582
 SNCASE SE-600
 SNCASE SE-700 
 SNCASE SE-700A
 SNCASE SE-700B
 SNCASE SE-701
 SNCASE SE-702
 SNCASE SE-800
 SNCASE SE-1000
 SNCASE SE-1010
 SNCASE SE-1030
 SNCASE SE-1200
 SNCASE SE-1210
 SNCASE SE-1800
 SNCASE SE-2000
 SNCASE SE-2010 Armagnac
 SNCASE SE-2100
 SNCASE SE-2300
 SNCASE SE-2310
 SNCASE SE-2311
 SNCASE SE-2400
 SNCASE SE-2410 Grognard I
 SNCASE SE-2415 Grognard II
 SNCASE SE-2418 Grognard
 SNCASE SE-2421 Grognard
 SNCASE SE-3000
 SNCASE SE-3100
 SNCASE SE-3101
 SNCASE SE-3110
 SNCASE SE-3120 Alouette
 SNCASE SE-3130 Alouette II
 SNCASE SE-3131 Gouverneur
 SNCASE SE-3140
 SNCASE SE-3150 Llama
 SNCASE SE-3160 Alouette III
 SNCASE SE-3200 Frelon
 SNCASE SE-3210 Super Frelon
 SNCASE SE-5000 Baroudeur
 SNCASE SE-5003 Baroudeur
 SNCASE Aquilon
 SNCASE Vampire Mk 53
 SNCASE SE-S.55

SNCASO
(Société Nationale de Constructions Aéronautiques du Sud Ouest)
 SNCASO SO.30 Bretagne
 SNCASO SO.30 Bellatrix
 SNCASO SO.80 Biarritz
 SNCASO SO.90 Cassiopée
 SNCASO SO.93 Corse
 SNCASO SO.94 Corse II
 SNCASO SO.95M Corse III
 SNCASO SO.175
 SNCASO SO.177
 SNCASO SO.1100 Ariel I
 SNCASO SO.1110 Ariel II
 SNCASO SO.1120 Ariel III
 SNCASO SO.1221 Djinn
 SNCASO SO.1310 Farfadet
 SNCASO SO.3050
 SNCASO SO.M1
 SNCASO SO.M2
 SNCASO SO P.1
 SNCASO SO.4000
 SNCASO SO.4050 Vautour II
 SNCASO SO.6000 Triton
 SNCASO SO.6020 Espadon
 SNCASO SO.6021 Espadon
 SNCASO SO.6025 Espadon
 SNCASO SO.6026 Espadon
 SNCASO SO.7010 Pégase
 SNCASO SO.7050
 SNCASO SO.7055 Deauville
 SNCASO SO.7060 Deauville
 SNCASO SO.8000 Narval
 SNCASO SO.9000 Trident I
 SNCASO SO.9050 Trident II
 SNCASO SO.9050 Trident III

SNECMA
(Société Nationale d'Etudes et de Construction de Moteurs d'Avions)
 SNECMA Coléoptère
 SNECMA ATAR Volant

SOSA 
(Société  Oyonnaxienne des Sports Aériens)
 Léglise L.500 Jumbo

Snell 
(Harry B Snell, Toledo, OH)
 Snell 1910 helicogyre

SnoBird
(SnoBird Aircraft Company)
 SnoBird Explorer

Snoke 
(R Snoke)
 Snoke Swifty Jr

Snow Aeronautical 
( (Leland) Snow Aeronautical Co, Olney, TX)
 Snow S-1
 Snow S-2

Snyder 
(Motor Gliders Inc, Johnson Airport (fdr: Orville H "Bud" Snyder) aka Aire Kraft Inc, Dayton, OH)
 Snyder Baby Bomber
 Snyder Buzzard Light Plane a.k.a. MG-1
 Snyder OHS-III

Snyder 
(Charles Snyder, Lockport, IL)
 Snyder FS-1

Snyder 
(Dr. Cloyd L. Snyder)
 Snyder Glider
 Snyder Dirigiplane
 Snyder A-2

Snyder-Macready 
(Orville H. Snyder & Lt John A. Macready, Dayton, OH)
 Snyder-Macready Baby Bomber

References

Further reading

External links

 List Of Aircraft (S)

de:Liste von Flugzeugtypen/N–S
fr:Liste des aéronefs (N-S)
nl:Lijst van vliegtuigtypes (N-S)
pt:Anexo:Lista de aviões (N-S)
ru:Список самолётов (N-S)
sv:Lista över flygplan/N-S
vi:Danh sách máy bay (N-S)